Repomys is an extinct genus of Cricetidae that existed during the late Hemphillian and Blancan periods.

List of species
 Repomys arizonensis Tomida, 1987
 Repomys gustelyi May, 1981
 Repomys maxumi May, 1981
 Repomys panacaensis May, 1981

References

Cricetidae
Prehistoric mammals of North America
Pliocene rodents